William Vesey Munnings was Chief Justice of the Bahamas in the early nineteenth-century.

References 

Chief justices of the Bahamas
Year of birth missing
Year of death missing